Vicente L. Rafael is a professor of Southeast Asian history at the University of Washington, Seattle. He received his B.A. in history and philosophy from Ateneo de Manila University in 1977 and his Ph.D. in history at Cornell University in 1984. Prior to teaching at the University of Washington, Rafael taught at the University of California, San Diego and the University of Hawaii at Manoa. Currently, he sits on advisory boards of Cultural Anthropology, Public Culture, and positions.

Research
Rafael has researched and taught on Southeast Asia, particularly the Philippines, comparative colonialism, particularly of Spain and the United States, and comparative nationalism. Though a historian, he has also focused on the related fields of cultural anthropology and literary studies and pursued topics ranging from language and power, translation and religious conversion, technology and humanity, and the politics and poetics of representation.

Publications
In 1993, Duke University Press published Contracting Colonialism: Translation and Christian Conversion in Tagalog Society Under Early Spanish Rule, in which Rafael examined the role of language and translation in the religious conversion of Tagalogs to Catholicism during the early period of Spanish rule of the Philippines. In 1995, Temple University Press published a collection he edited entitled Discrepant Histories: Translocal Essays on Filipino Cultures that studied a number of issues in the formation of the Philippine nation-state and translocal Filipino cultures.<ref>[http://www.temple.edu/tempress/titles/1231_reg.html Discrepant Histories from Temple University Press]</ref> In 1999, Cornell University Press published Figures of Criminality in Indonesia, the Philippines, and Colonial Vietnam, a collection of essays on the relationships between criminality and colonial state formation. In 2000, Duke University Press published his White Love and Other Events in Filipino History, a challenging of traditional, epic narratives of Filipino history and especially the emergence of revolutionary nationalism. The Promise of the Foreign: Nationalism and the Technics of Translation in the Spanish Philippines'', also published by Duke University Press, appeared in 2005 and is the second volume of Contracting Colonialism. Its main argument is that translation was crucial to the emergence of Filipino nationalism, a mechanism from which was issued the promise of nationhood. This book was followed by "Motherless Tongues: The Insurgency of Language Amid Wars of Translation", also published by Duke UP in 2016 which delved into topics ranging from the colonial introduction of English in the Philippines to the fate of interpreters in Iraq during wartime. Rafael also wrote the introduction to a volume of the works by Nick Joaquin, "The Woman Who Had Two Navels and Tales of the Tropical Gothic" which came out in 2017 from Penguin Classics. Most recently in 2022, he published "The Sovereign Trickster: Death and Laughter in the Age of Duterte" which offers what he calls a "prismatic history" of the social conditions and historical contexts for understanding the regime of Rodrigo Duterte, also published by Duke UP.

External links
 Vicente L. Rafael's Website
 Faculty profile from University of Washington Department of History

Notes

Cornell University alumni
Living people
University of Washington faculty
Historians of Southeast Asia
Ateneo de Manila University alumni
Place of birth missing (living people)
20th-century Filipino historians
Filipino educators
1956 births
21st-century Filipino historians